Jonah of Moscow (Иона in Russian) (died 1461), was the Metropolitan of Kiev and all Rus'. He reigned from 1448 to his death in 1461. He was appointed at the behest of the secular authorities in Muscovy as his predecessor on the throne — Isidore of Kiev — was adjudged to have apostatized to Catholicism.  Like his immediate predecessors, he permanently resided in Moscow, and was the last Moscow-based primate of the metropolis to keep the traditional title with reference to the metropolitan city of Kiev. He was also the first metropolitan in Moscow to be appointed without the approval of the Ecumenical Patriarch of Constantinople as had been the norm. He is recognised as a saint in the Russian Orthodox Church.

Biography
Since the late 1420s, Jonah had been living in the Simonov Monastery in Moscow and was close to Metropolitan Photius, who make him Bishop of Ryazan and Murom. After Photius's death in 1431, Grand Prince Vasili II nominated Jonas for the post of Metropolitan, but the Uniate Patriarch Joseph II chose Isidore to become the Metropolitan of Kiev and All Rus'.

After Isidore had been condemned and deposed by Vasily II and his bishops in Moscow in 1441, for his attempts to implement the decision on the Union of the Eastern and Western (Roman) Churches agreed upon at the Council of Florence-Ferrara, the metropolitan throne sat vacant for seven years.

Jonah was elected by the bishops of the Moscow Rus' Metropolitan on 15 December 1448, without the consent of the Patriarch of Constantinople. While the failure to obtain the blessing from Constantinople was not intentional, this signified the beginning of the de facto independence (autocephaly) of the Moscow (North-Eastern) part of the Russian Church.

He fought a losing battle attempting to prevent the loss of his South-Western province: in 1458, the Uniate Patriarch Gregory Mammas of Constantinople appointed the Uniate bishop Gregory metropolitan of the newly established Uniate Kiev metropolitanate. The Patriarch gave the new Metropolitan the title of the Metropolitan of Kiev, Galich and All Rus'. The Polish-Lithuanian rulers, under whose domain Kiev then fell, supported Gregory.

Jonah died on March 31, 1461 and was buried in the Cathedral of the Dormition in the Moscow Kremlin.  He was canonized by  Macarius, the head of the Russian Orthodox Church, at the Moscow Council of 1547.

References

Jonah of Moscow
15th-century Christian saints
Russian saints of the Eastern Orthodox Church
Metropolitans of Kiev and all Rus' (Patriarchate of Moscow)
Russian saints
Miracle workers
Year of birth unknown